The 1953 Trinity Tigers football team was an American football team that represented Trinity University in San Antonio as a member of the Gulf Coast Conference (GCC) during the 1953 college football season. Led by second-year head coach William A. McElreath, the Tigers compiled an overall record of 8–1 with a mark of 2–0 in conference play, winning the GCC title.

Schedule

References

Trinity
Trinity Tigers football seasons
Trinity Tigers football